Gonzalo Rodríguez Pacho (born 27 June 1991) is a Spanish footballer who plays as a midfielder for Alcalá.

Career
Rodríguez's senior career started with Guadalajara in 2011, having previously featured for their youth teams. He made his professional debut in the Segunda División on 3 December 2011 versus Girona, which was one of four appearances in his first two seasons with Guadalajara; which concluded with relegation to Segunda División B. Rodríguez was selected once more in the following campaign of 2013–14, prior to joining Azuqueca. Two years later, Alcalá completed the signing of Rodríguez; having had him on trial years prior.

Career statistics
.

References

External links

1991 births
Living people
People from Alcalá de Henares
Spanish footballers
Association football midfielders
Segunda División players
Segunda División B players
CD Guadalajara (Spain) footballers
CD Azuqueca players
RSD Alcalá players